Nicolás Ezequiel Fernández Mercau (born 11 January 2000) is an Argentine professional footballer who plays for Spanish club Elche CF. Mainly a left-back, he can also play as a winger.

Club career

San Lorenzo
Fernández progressed through all of the youth levels at San Lorenzo. He signed his first professional contract on 5 September 2018, prior to appearing on the bench for a Copa Argentina defeat to Temperley in October. He didn't appear on another first-team teamsheet until November 2020; for a Copa de la Liga Profesional match with Estudiantes, though again didn't get onto the pitch. Fernández's senior debut soon arrived though, with Mariano Soso selecting to come on for Juan Ramírez in a victory away to Aldosivi on 14 November.

Elche
On 1 September 2022, Fernández moved abroad and signed a five-year contract with La Liga side Elche CF.

Career statistics
.

Notes

References

External links

2000 births
Living people
Footballers from Buenos Aires
Argentine footballers
Association football midfielders
Argentine Primera División players
San Lorenzo de Almagro footballers
Elche CF players
Argentine expatriate footballers
Argentine expatriate sportspeople in Spain
Expatriate footballers in Spain